Operation Sea Horse was the naval part of Operation Lusty. Lusty's purpose was to locate and recover top secret German weaponry, e.g. aircraft and weapons.

Ship involvement
The escort aircraft carrier HMS Reaper took part in the operation, being used to ferry captured airframes. On 23 July 1945, Reaper left Cherbourg for Newark, New Jersey. The news of the Japanese surrender came through during the voyage.

Aircraft captured
On the ocean voyage to Allied bases, the planes were covered in protective "shrink wrap'" to protect them from sea spray. It was reported  that the following aircraft were captured:

Ten Me 262s
Five Focke-Wulf 190 Fs
Four Focke-Wulf 190 Ds
One Focke-Wulf Ta 152
Four Arado Ar 234s
Three Heinkel He 219s
Three Messerschmitt Bf 109s
Two Dornier Do 335s
Two Bücker Bü 181s
One Doblhoff WNF 342
Two Flettner Fl 282s
One Junkers Ju 88 G
One Junkers Ju 388 
One Messerschmitt Bf 108
One North American P-51 Mustang
At least one Horten flying wing aircraft, including the nearly-completed Jumo 004 jet-powered Ho 229 V3 prototype, which resides at present at Paul Garber Preservation, Restoration, and Storage Facility in Suitland, Maryland

Aircraft uses
In thanks for British help for providing the services of one of their aircraft carriers, the Americans gave them five Messerschmitt Me 262s for testing. The other five Messerschmitt Me 262s stayed with the AAF, and were flown to an airfield in Indiana known as Freeman Field where tests could be carried out relatively secretly. On 19 August, one of two Messerschmitt Me 262s travelling to Freeman Field via Pittsburgh crashed into a field during landing, with all that remained of the aircraft salvageable parts.

See also 
 Operation Paperclip

References

Sea Horse